Charlotte, North Carolina is a U.S. city that serves as a hub for numerous media sources.

Television

The Charlotte television market is the 24th largest TV market in the United States, and the largest in North Carolina, according to Nielsen Media Research.
 Charlotte is the Largest Market In The United States Where The Big 6 is not Owned & Operated

Local television stations
Network owned-and-operated stations are highlighted in bold.

National cable channels
ESPNU/SEC Network
Fox Sports 1 formerly SPEED

Charlotte was also the former home of the Inspiration Network (INSP), which is now in Indian Land, South Carolina.

Local cable channels
Bally Sports South
Spectrum News 1 North Carolina

Radio
The Charlotte radio market is the 24th largest in the U.S., according to Arbitron. Broadcast radio stations serving the market include, in order of format:

Adult Contemporary
WKQC 104.7 FM 
WLNK 107.9 FM 
Americana
WNCW 101.3 FM
Classical
WDAV 89.9 FM
Country
WIXE 1190 AM
WKKT 96.9 FM
WRHM-FM 107.1 FM
WSOC-FM 103.7 FM
News/Talk/Sports
WBT 1110 AM and 99.3 FM (news)
WFAE 90.7 FM (NPR news)
WFNZ 610 (sports)
WHKY 1290 AM (talk)
WNSC-FM 88.9 (news, broadcasts from Rock Hill, South Carolina)
WRHI 1340 AM and 94.3 FM (news)
WTCG 870 AM (simulcast from 1370 AM in Clayton, Georgia)
WZGV 730 AM (ESPN sports)
Oldies
WEGO 1410
WRBK-FM 90.3 FM
Public Radio
WSGE 91.7 FM
Religious
Adult Standards
WAVO 1150 AM (contemporary Christian)
WHVN 1240 AM (Spanish language)
WCGC 1270 AM (Catholic)
WDEX 1430 AM (Southern gospel)
WGFY 1480 AM (LifeTalk Radio)
WMIT 106.9 FM (contemporary Christian)
WOGR 1540 AM (Christian)
WPZS 100.9 FM (Urban Gospel)
WRCM-FM 91.9 FM ("K-LOVE" contemporary Christian)
WWLV 94.1 FM ("K-LOVE" contemporary Christian broadcasts from the Piedmont Triad)
WYFQ 93.5 FM and 930 AM (Bible Broadcasting Network)
WCRU 960 AM
Rock
WXRC 95.7 FM (rock-leaning classic hits)
WRFX 99.7 FM (classic rock)
WLKO 102.9 FM (adult hits)
WEND 106.5 FM (modern rock)
Spanish
WNOW 1030 AM 
WOLS 106.1 FM (regional Mexican)
WXNC 1060 AM
WGSP 1310 AM
WGSP-FM 102.3 FM (Tropical and Latin Pop)
Top 40/Pop
WHQC 96.1 FM 
WNKS 95.1 FM
Urban
WFNZ-FM 92.7 FM (Mainstream Urban)
WPEG 97.9 FM (Mainstream Urban)
WBAV-FM 101.9 FM (Urban Adult Contemporary)
WOSF 105.3 FM (Urban Oldies)
WGIV 1370 AM/103.3 FM (Urban Variety)
Variety
WYLI-LP 93.7 FM

See also
 North Carolina media
 List of newspapers in North Carolina
 List of radio stations in North Carolina
 List of television stations in North Carolina
 Media of cities in North Carolina: Asheville,  Durham, Fayetteville, Greensboro, High Point, Raleigh, Wilmington, Winston-Salem

References

 https://web.archive.org/web/20071215001842/http://www.ncpress.com/ncpa/newspapersonline.html North Carolina Press Association

 
Charlotte